The Guam national basketball team represents Guam in international competitions. It is administrated by the Guam Basketball Confederation.

Guam is the only nation other than Australia and New Zealand to win a silver medal at the FIBA Oceania Championship.

Current roster
Roster for the 2021 FIBA Asia Cup qualification match played on 23 February 2020 against New Zealand.

Depth chart

Competitive performances

FIBA Oceania Championship

Oceania Basketball Tournament
1981 : 
1985-1993 : Did not participate
1997 : 
2001 : Did not participate 
2005 : 
2009 : 
2013 : ?

Pacific Games

Guam is the second most successful team in the Pacific Games, winning the trophy three times, one short of Tahiti. The team last won in 2015 and 2019.
1966 : 
1969 : 4th
1971 : 4th
1975 : 
1979 : 
1983 : 
1987 : 
1991 : 
1995 : 4th
1999 : 
2003 : 
2007 : 
2011 : 
2015 : 
2019 : 
2023 : To be determined

Past rosters
At the 2015 Pacific Games:  (Gold medal squad)

Kit

Sponsor
2020: Bank of Guam

See also
 Guam national under-19 basketball team
 Guam national 3x3 team

References

External links
Guam Basketball
Guam Basketball Records at FIBA Archive
Australiabasket - Guam Men National Team 
Presentation on Facebook

Videos
Pacific Games 2015 BASKETBALL G6 GUAM vs SAMOA Youtube.com video

1974 establishments in Guam
Guam national basketball team
Basketball in Guam
Basketball teams established in 1974